The 1951 Penn Quakers football team was an American football team that represented the University of Pennsylvania during the 1951 college football season. In their 14th year under head coach George Munger, the Quakers compiled a 5–4 record and outscored opponents 121 to 117. Harry Warren was the team captain.

Penn played its home games at Franklin Field adjacent to the university's campus in Philadelphia, Pennsylvania.

Schedule

References

Penn
Penn Quakers football seasons
Penn Quakers football